Qari Muhammad Yousaf (born 1 January 1952) is a Pakistani politician who had been a member of the National Assembly of Pakistan, from June 2013 to May 2018. Previously, he had been a member of the National Assembly from 2002 to 2007.

Early life
He was born on 1 January 1952.

Political career

He was elected to the National Assembly of Pakistan as a candidate of Muttahida Majlis-e-Amal (MMA) from Constituency NA-22 (Battagram) in 2002 Pakistani general election. He received 24,092 votes and defeated Muhammad Nawaz Khan, a candidate of Pakistan Muslim League (Q) (PML-Q).

He ran for the seat of the National Assembly as a candidate of MMA from Constituency NA-22 (Battagram) in 2008 Pakistani general election but was unsuccessful. He received 20036 votes and lost the seat to Muhammad Nawaz Khan, a candidate of PML-Q.

He was re-elected to the National Assembly as a candidate of Jamiat Ulema-e-Islam (F) from Constituency NA-22 (Battagram) in 2013 Pakistani general election. He received 18,314 votes and defeated Mohammad Nawaz Khan, an independent candidate.

References

Living people
Swati
People from Battagram District
Pakistani MNAs 2013–2018
1952 births
Jamiat Ulema-e-Islam (F) politicians
Pakistani MNAs 2002–2007